Mayra Karina Robles Aguirre (born 7 September 1972) is a Mexican politician affiliated with the PRI. As of 2013 she served as Deputy of the LXII Legislature of the Mexican Congress representing Baja California.

References

1972 births
Living people
Women members of the Chamber of Deputies (Mexico)
Institutional Revolutionary Party politicians
Politicians from Tijuana
21st-century Mexican politicians
21st-century Mexican women politicians
Deputies of the LXII Legislature of Mexico
Members of the Chamber of Deputies (Mexico) for Baja California